Baa Baaa Black Sheep is a 2018 Indian action comedy film starring Anupam Kher, Manish Paul, Annu Kapoor, Manjari Phadnis & Kay Kay Menon in lead roles. The film is directed by Vishwas Paandya and produced by Anand Swarup Agarwal & Krishna Datla while it's presented by Soham Rockstar. The film was released on 23 March 2018.

Plot
Baa Baa Black Sheep is the story of Baba, who is still trying to find his bearings. Baba's father, Charudutt Sharma who is a boring Cashew nut dealer for everyone, reveals to a shocked Baba on his 25th birthday that actually they are a family of hit men since the past 12 generations, and now Baba has to take over as the 13th. On the other hand, Baba's love interest Angelina runs a Beach Cafe. Her father Brian Morris is a retired art teacher, but fuels his greed for money and excitement, by selling fakes of an old Renoir painting that his family has inherited. With Baba and Angelina, both keeping their respective secrets, problems start when Kamya, an art gallery owner, wants the original Renoir and blackmails the Home Minister, Utpal Shivalkar for it. Drugs, Contract killings and blackmail account for ACP Shivraj entering the scene trying to find out the connection between all the chaos.

Cast
 Manish Paul as Baba
 Anupam Kher as Charudutt Sharma/Charlie
 Manjari Phadnis as Angelina Morris
 Annu Kapoor as Brian Morris/Santa Claus
 Kay Kay Menon as A.C.P Shivraj Naik
 Natasha Suri as Kamya
 Manish Wadhwa as Utpal Shivalkar/Home Minister
 Mamta Verma as Manju Sharma
 B. Shantanu as Kamaal
 Vineet Sharma as Daniel D'Costa
 Aakash Dabhade as Johny Fixer
 Kirthi Shetty as Jamaal
 Scarlett Mellish Wilson as item number "Galla Goriyan"

Soundtrack
Galla Goriyan / Aaja Soniye – The first song of the film is recreated by Gourav-Roshin which is based on Abhijit Vaghani's Mashup from The T-Series Mixtape Punjabi.

References

External links

 

Indian action comedy films
2010s Hindi-language films
T-Series (company) films
2018 action comedy films